Rachida el-Charni (born 1967) is a Tunisian writer. She has published three collections of short stories and one novel. Her short story 'Street of the House of Wonders' (also known as 'The way to Poppy Street') was in Habila Helon's The Granta Book of the African Short Story - a collection of short stories from prominent African writers, including Chimamanda Adichie, Mansoura Ez-Eldin, Doreen Baingana, Henrietta Rose-Innes, E. C. Osondu, Alex La Guma and Camara Laye among others.

Prizes 
 First prize, Arab Women’s Creative Writing (Sharjah), 2000, for her second collection of short stories
 Centre of Arab Woman for Training and Research (Tunisia), 1997, for her first collection of short stories

Selected works

Novels 
 Tarateel li-Alamiha (Hymns for her Pain), 2011

Short story collections 
 Saheel al-Asaila (The Neighing of Questions), 2002

References

1967 births
Living people
Tunisian short story writers
Tunisian novelists
21st-century Tunisian writers
21st-century Tunisian women writers